Beth Israel Synagogue is a historic Carpenter Gothic style Orthodox synagogue located in Edenbridge in the rural municipality of Willow Creek, near Melfort, Saskatchewan, Canada. The Edenbridge Hebrew Colony was founded in 1906 by Jewish immigrants who came from Lithuania via South Africa. Completed in 1908, the synagogue's wooden frame exterior, steep pitched roof and end lancet windows are typical of the plain Carpenter Gothic style buildings built by other religious groups in Saskatchewan and the rest of rural North America during the late 19th and early 20th centuries. The elegant interior, however, reflects the Eastern European roots of the Orthodox congregation. Today Beth Israel is the "oldest surviving synagogue in Saskatchewan."

Beth Israel Synagogue, including its adjacent cemetery, is a  municipal heritage site as designated by the Rural Municipality of Willow Creek  on September 10, 2003." The plot of land was donated in 1987 to the Saskatchewan Wildlife Federation.

See also
 Little Synagogue on the Prairie
 History of the Jews in Canada
 Oldest synagogues in Canada

References

External links
 International Association of Jewish Genealogical Societies - Cemetery Project: Saskatchewan: Edenbridge
 Little Synagogue on the Prairie: p. 16: Saskatchewan

1908 establishments in Saskatchewan
Carpenter Gothic synagogues
Synagogues in Saskatchewan
Carpenter Gothic buildings in Saskatchewan
Cemeteries in Saskatchewan
Heritage sites in Saskatchewan
Jewish cemeteries in Canada
Lithuanian Canadian
Lithuanian-Jewish diaspora
Willow Creek No. 458, Saskatchewan
Synagogues completed in 1908
South African Canadian
South African-Jewish diaspora
20th-century religious buildings and structures in Canada